Lee William Aaker (September 25, 1943 – April 1, 2021) was an American child actor, producer, carpenter, and ski instructor known for his appearance as Rusty of "B-Company" in the 1950s television program The Adventures of Rin Tin Tin.  He was the final surviving cast member of the series. In 1952, Lee Aaker appeared in Desperate Search with Howard Keel and Keenan Wynn.

Early years 
Aaker's mother, Mrs. Myles Wilbour, was the owner of a dancing school in Los Angeles. (Another source says that she "ran a children's theatre academy" and that when Aaker was 4, she had him "singing and dancing at local clubs.")

Film 
On television as a young child, he started appearing uncredited at the age of 8 in films such as The Greatest Show on Earth (1952) and High Noon (1952). He quickly moved to featured status by the end of that year.

He showed talent as the kidnapped "Red Chief" in a segment of the film O. Henry's Full House (1952) and another kidnap victim as the son of scientist Gene Barry in The Atomic City (1952).

In 1953, he co-starred in the John Wayne western classic Hondo (1953) as the curious blond son of homesteader Geraldine Page.

He also appeared in other film styles such as the film noir thriller Jeopardy (1953) with Barbara Stanwyck, the horse opera drama Arena (1953) with Gig Young, and the comedies Mister Scoutmaster (1953) with Clifton Webb and Ricochet Romance (1954) with Marjorie Main.

Television 
In 1953–54, Aaker was among the many child actors who auditioned for the role of "Jeff Miller" on the original 1954 Lassie series, which later aired as Jeff's Collie. That role went to Tommy Rettig. Two weeks later, Aaker won the role of "Rusty" on The Adventures of Rin-Tin-Tin, co-starring James Brown (1920–1992) as Lieutenant Ripley "Rip" Masters.

Aaker and Rettig were friends, and both shows were popular with audiences. The two actors and the two star dogs appeared together in a photograph used on the cover of the July 2, 1955 issue of TV Guide.

Later years 
Aaker told a newspaper reporter that when he reached the age of 21, he was paid a $10,000 lump sum by the studio that produced Rin Tin Tin "and he spent the rest of the '60s traveling around the world 'as sort of a flower child." Unable to find work as an adult actor, Aaker got involved as a producer and later worked as a carpenter.

Personal life
In the late 1960s, Aaker was married to Sharon Ann Hamilton for two years. He resided in Mammoth Lakes, California, for many years and was the first adaptive sports instructor for Disabled Sports Eastern Sierra at Mammoth Mountain.

According to Paul Petersen, an advocate for former child actors, Aaker experienced poverty toward the end of his life, and had struggled for years with substance abuse. Petersen said Aaker had suffered a stroke and died in Maricopa County, Arizona, near the city of Mesa, on April 1, 2021, and was listed as an "indigent decedent". Petersen was arranging Aaker's burial. As a US Air Force veteran during the Vietnam War, he was buried at the National Memorial Cemetery of Arizona in Phoenix.

Recognition
In 2005, Aaker won the Golden Boot Award as Kids of the West.

Filmography

Film

Television

References

Further reading
 Goldrup, Tom and Jim. Growing Up on the Set: Interviews with 39 Former Child Actors of Classic Film and Television. Jefferson, NC: McFarland & Co., 2002, pp. 5–12.
 Holmstrom, John. The Moving Picture Boy: An International Encyclopaedia from 1895 to 1995, Norwich, Michael Russell, 1996, p. 241.
 Dye, David. Child and Youth Actors: Filmography of Their Entire Careers, 1914–1985. Jefferson, NC: McFarland & Co., 1988, p. 1.

External links
 
 
 
 

1943 births
2021 deaths
20th-century American male actors
Burials in Arizona
Male actors from Los Angeles
American male film actors
American male television actors
American male child actors
People from Mammoth Lakes, California